Mainling County is a county under the jurisdiction of the prefecture-level city of Nyingchi in eastern Tibet Autonomous Region.

Geography
Mainling County is located in the central-west of the Nyingtri Prefecture, at the middle reaches of the Yarlung Tsangpo River, and between the Nyenchen Tanglha Mountains and the Himalayan Mountains. It covers an area of 9,471 square kilometres. The average altitude is 3,700 metres above sea level.

Climate

Economy
The mine resources of the county are gold dust, plaster, limestone, chromium and iron, etc.

The main economy style in Mainling County is farming and forest industry. The main species of the trees are fir, spruce, pine, oak, and cypress, etc. The total cumulation volume of woods is 40 million cubic metres. The special fruit productions are apples, apple pears, walnuts and peaches.

Nyingchi Mainling Airport is located in Mainling County.

Demography

In 1999 the county had a population of 17347 inhabitants.

The county is home to the Lhoba people.

Villages

Zhongsa Village (Danniang Township)

References

External links
Tibetinfor.com
Mainling County Annals

Counties of Tibet
Nyingchi